This is a list of Xbox Live enabled games on Windows 10 currently planned or released on Windows 10 operating systems through the Windows Store application. The first wave of Windows 10 Xbox Live games were announced on Xbox Wire in March 2015. All Xbox Live enabled games on Windows 10 are made available on the Windows Store. In order to be released on Windows 10 as an Xbox Live enabled game, the developer needs to be a member of ID@Xbox.

Xbox Live enabled titles will be identifiable in the marketplace by a green banner running across the top of the game page icon that reads "Xbox Live". Games with Cross-buy Column checked yes are part of Xbox Play Anywhere program which allows gamers to play a title on both Xbox One and Windows 10 PCs with a single digital purchase of a supported game.

Xbox Live Games on Windows 10

Playable = 147 available to purchase
Total =

List

Free-to-play

See also
 List of Games for Windows – Live titles
 List of Xbox 360 games compatible with Xbox One
 List of Xbox Live games on Windows 8.x
 List of Xbox One applications
 List of Xbox One games
 List of Xbox Play Anywhere games

References

Xbox network
Windows 10
Xbox Live